My Heart Is Mine Alone is a 1997 German experimental drama film directed by Helma Sanders-Brahms. A 1997 issue of Jewish Currents wrote that the film is "a kind of German movie that usually requires more than one screening to decipher and is made for avant-garde devotees."

Plot
The story of the real-life love affair between Jewish poet Else Lasker-Schüler and Nazi poet Gottfried Benn is told largely through their poetry throughout the film. Lasker-Schüler is forced to leave the country because of the very ideology Benn espouses, and while she drifts from country to country en route to Jerusalem, he eventually realizes his mistake when the Nazis condemn his artistic school.

Cast
Lena Stolze as Else Lasker-Schüler
Thomas Ruffer	as Berthold Lasker
René Schubert	as Noble
Katja Ruttloff as Else Lasker-Schüler's Sister
Anna Sanders as Edith Benn
Cornelius Obonya as Gottfried Benn
Tomek Schulz as Young Gottfried Benn
Christian Schlemmer as Wassily Kandinsky
Janina Berge as Young	Else Lasker-Schüler
Stefan Ostertag as Franz Marc
Nicolai Albrecht as Marc Chagall
Inken Schmitz as Lasker Family Member
Wolfgang Tebbe as Lasker Family Member
Dagmar Bertram as Lasker Family Member
Matthias Wessolek as Fat Cat
Klaus Bunk as Herwarth Walden
Sabine Panzer	as Nell Walden
Oliver Grice as Gustav Benn
Lothar von Versen as Peter Hille
Julia Kiessling as Else Lasker-Schüler's Sister
Leonard Schnitman as Paul Schüler
Nikolai Sirenko as Aaron Schüler
Valentina Sirenko as Jeannette Schüler
Bruno Dunst as Professor

Release
The film was released on DVD by Facets Multi-Media in 2008.

Reception
Critical opinion has been largely positive. The film was screened out of competition at the 1997 Berlin International Film Festival and was nominated for the Maverick Spirit Award at the Cinequest Film Festival in 1998 as well as for the Emden Film Award at the International Filmfest Emden in 1997. Variety, although opining that the film was "flat," nevertheless praised the leading actress' "charm and energy," as did Metro Silicon Valley critic Richard von Busack, who wrote that "[d]ark, pocket-size and intense, Stolze has the magnetism to prove why men thought of Lasker-Schüler as an Expressionist vampire," and critic Ed Soohoo, who wrote that it is "wonderful to see" Lena Stolze "once again on screen as she brings life to Else." Critic Peter Nellhaus has praised the film's "expressionist collage of conventional biographical re-enactment, stylized staging, and documentary" and wrote that he regards it as a "truthful film."

References

External links

My Heart Is Mine Alone at the TCM Movie Database
Mein Herz – niemandem! at Film Portal 

1990s biographical drama films
1990s historical drama films
1997 films
Biographical films about writers
Films about Jews and Judaism
Films about Nazi Germany
Films based on poems
Films directed by Helma Sanders-Brahms
Films set in Jerusalem
Films set in the 1860s
Films set in the 1870s
Films set in the 1880s
Films set in the 1890s
Films set in the 1900s
Films set in the 1910s
Films set in the 1920s
Films set in the 1930s
Films set in the 1940s
Films set in the 1950s
German avant-garde and experimental films
German biographical drama films
German historical drama films
1990s German-language films
Films about Nazis
1990s avant-garde and experimental films
1997 drama films
1990s German films